Julien Watrin (born 27 June 1992) is a Belgian sprinter specialising in the 400 metres. In 2023, he won his first individual major senior medal, with silver at the 2023 European Indoor Championships. Watrin earned several major medals with national men's 4 × 400 m relays, including bronzes at the 2019 and 2022 World Athletics Championships.

He is the Belgian record holder for the 400 m hurdles, Belgian indoor record holder for the 400 m, and won several national titles.

Statistics

International competitions

Personal bests
 100 metres – 10.39 (+1.5 m/s, Mannheim 2010) 
 200 metres – 20.80 (−0.4 m/s, Brussels 2013)
 200 metres indoor – 20.90 (Ghent 2023)
 400 metres – 45.56 (La Chaux-de-Fonds 2021)
 400 metres indoor – 45.44 (Istanbul 2023) 
 400 m hurdles – 48.66 (Brussels 2022)

National titles
 Belgian Athletics Championships
 100 metres: 2012, 2013
 200 metres: 2020
 400 metres: 2016
 400 m hurdles: 2019
 Belgian Indoor Athletics Championships
 400 metres: 2022

See also
 Belgian men's 4 × 400 metres relay team

References

External links
 

1992 births
Living people
Belgian male sprinters
People from Virton
European Championships (multi-sport event) gold medalists
European Athletics Championships winners
Athletes (track and field) at the 2016 Summer Olympics
Olympic athletes of Belgium
World Athletics Championships athletes for Belgium
World Athletics Championships medalists
Belgian Athletics Championships winners
European Athletics Indoor Championships winners
Sportspeople from Luxembourg (Belgium)